Amorphous  is the fourth studio album by American rock band Icon for Hire. Produced by David Thulin and Shawn Jump, the work was published on February 19, 2021, via Kartel Music Group.

Critical reception 
New Noise Magazine stated that "This latest record poignantly continues the project's longtime fresh and emotionally invigorating energy" and that "the project combines a synthy journey with jarring hard rock riffs".

Jeannie Blue of Cryptic Rock describes the album as "chock full of passionate emotions, eclectic influences, and enough courage to perpetually defy genre within the span of each individual track".

Ian Kenworth of Punktastic states that the work "pushes the electronic sound further still, so that every song feels ambitious and arena-sized, even the interludes" and that "it makes for a bold record and there is a lot to enjoy here".

Scott Raymer of ConcertCrap states that "Amorphous is about defiance, not giving in, taking control and fighting for yourself".

BroadwayWorld describes "Their previous singles including "Seeds" and "Last One Standing" are rebellious opuses, instilling a message of self-belief and empowerment, not just in an industry that has pushed back at the band with numerous challenges, but for their entire fan base in general".

Track listing

References 

2021 albums
Icon for Hire albums